Sons & Daughters is  a San Francisco restaurant that was recognized with a Michelin Guide star starting in 2010. It is located in Nob Hill, San Francisco. The owners are Teague Moriarty and Matt McNamara.

Awards and honors
3.5 Stars, San Francisco Chronicle.
1 Star, Michelin Guide

See also
List of Michelin starred restaurants
Teague Moriarty

References

External links

Restaurants in San Francisco
Michelin Guide starred restaurants in California